Christ Episcopal Church is a historic church located at 64 State Street in Montpelier, Vermont in the United States. It was founded in 1840. Among its founders was Dr. Julius Yemans Dewey, local physician, founder of Vermont's National Life Insurance Company, and father of Spanish–American War hero Admiral George Dewey.

See also

 Christ Episcopal Church (disambiguation) for other churches of the same name

References

External links
 Web Site

Churches completed in 1840
19th-century Episcopal church buildings
Episcopal churches in Vermont
Buildings and structures in Montpelier, Vermont
Churches in Washington County, Vermont